HD5 was a Singaporean free-to-air television channel that was launched as the high-definition version of Channel 5. It was the first HD broadcast on DTT in Southeast Asia. HD5 aired 10 hours of HD-produced series each week, including movies, dramas and original productions made by Mediacorp.

In late 2013, Channel 5 HD was launched on DTT and aired simulcast programming with Channel 5's SD feed. Due to national availability of Channel 5 HD, HD5 was shut down on 1 October 2017 to free up the UHF spectrum.

See also 
 List of programmes broadcast by Channel 5 (Singapore)
 High-definition television in Singapore

References

External links 
 Sample Images Of HD5
 Discussion group

2006 establishments in Singapore
2017 disestablishments in Singapore
Broadcasting in Singapore
Mediacorp
Television stations in Singapore
Television channels and stations established in 2006
Television channels and stations disestablished in 2017